Dennis Washburn (born July 30, 1954) is the Jane and Raphael Bernstein Professor of Asian Studies at Dartmouth College where he has taught since 1992. He has served as chair of the Department of Asian and Middle Eastern Languages and Literatures and is currently chair of the Comparative Literature Program. Washburn has published extensively on Japanese literature and culture and is an active translator of both modern and classical Japanese fiction. In 2004 he received the Japanese Foreign Ministry's citation for contributions to cross-cultural understanding, and in 2008 he received the Japan-US Friendship Commission Translation Prize.

Education
Yale University: Ph.D. (June, 1991) – Along with Alan Tansman, Dennis earned his Ph.D under the tutelage of Edwin McClellan.

Waseda University: Monbusho Fellow (October, 1983 to March, 1985)

Pembroke College, Oxford University: MA (August, 1979)

Harvard University: BA  (June, 1976) – While at Harvard University, Dennis studied with some notable figures in American literature, such as Elizabeth Bishop.

Selected publications
Translating Mount Fuji: Modern Japanese Fiction and the Ethics of Identity, New York: Columbia University Press, 2006.

The Dilemma of the Modern in Japanese Fiction, New Haven: Yale University Press, 1995.

Editor with A. Kevin Reinhart, Converting Cultures: Ideology, Religion, and Transformations of Modernity, Leiden: Brill, 2007.

Editor with Carole Cavanaugh, Word and Image in Japanese Cinema, New York: Cambridge University Press, 2000.

Selected Translations
The Tale of Genji by Murasaki Shikibu (unabridged with annotations and “Introduction”), New York: W. W. Norton & Co., 2015.

Laughing Wolf (Warai ookami), a novel by Tsushima Yūko, Ann Arbor: Center for Japanese Studies, University of Michigan, 2011.

Temple of the Wild Geese (Gan no tera) and Bamboo Dolls of Echizen (Echizen takeningyō), two novellas by Mizukami Tsutomu, Dalkey Archive Press, 2008.

Shanghai, by Yokomitsu Riichi, Ann Arbor: Center for Japanese Studies, University of Michigan, 2001.

References

1954 births
Dartmouth College faculty
Yale University alumni
Harvard University alumni
Alumni of the University of Oxford
Japanese–English translators
Living people
American Japanologists